Clyde Sergio Narain (born 25 June 1978), known professionally as Chuckie, is a Surinamese DJ and producer. He lives in Aruba.

Chuckie was born in Paramaribo, Suriname. He is a producer of what has been called the "dirty trance" scene, a cultural movement centered on lively urban club events featuring dancing, bright lights and interactive stage elements. He has also helped develop a style of music known as "Dirty trance", a genre characterized by high pitched lead synths over Latin-inspired rhythms and samples.

Hits including "Let the Bass Kick", "Aftershock" and "Make Some Noise" (with Junxterjack) have contributed to his success. Chuckie has also remixed songs for, among others, Michael Jackson and David Guetta and has produced for 50 Cent, Kesha and Akon. Further, his work has been showcased on the popular EDM focused show "What's Hot in EDM?" on BBC Radio 1.

He also owns his record label, Dirty Dutch Music.

He currently hosts the one-hour rap, trap and hip hop show on KissFresh from 11pm every Wednesday.

Discography

Studio albums

Singles

As lead artist

As featured artist

Remixes
2003
 Ixxel – "Drop That Beat" (DJ Chuckie Mix)

2005
 Gio – "X–Girl" (DJ Chuckie Remix)
 Brace – "Hartendief" (DJ Chuckie Remix)

2006
 Real El Canario – "U Rock" (Chuckie's Not In Amsterdam Remix)

2007
 Ron Carroll – "Walking Down the Street" (Gregor Salto, Chuckie & Dave Moreaux Remix)

2008
 Sidney Samson featuring MC Stretch – "Pump Up the Stereo" (DJ Chuckie & Dave Moreaux Remix)
 Unders and Drrie – "3 Days in Kazachstan" (Chuckie Remix)
 The Partysquad – "Stuk" (Chuckie's Hustled Up Mix)
 Joachim Garraud – "Are U Ready" (Chuckie Remix)

2009
 David Guetta, Chris Willis, Steve Angello and Sebastian Ingrosso – "Everytime We Touch" (Chuckie Remix)
 David Guetta featuring Akon – "Sexy Bitch" (Chuckie & Lil Jon Remix)
 David Guetta featuring Estelle – "One Love" (Chuckie & Fatman Scoop Remix)
 Bob Sinclar featuring Shabba Ranks – "Love You No More" (Chuckie Remix)
 Groovewatchers – "Sexy Girl" (DJ Chuckie Remix)
 Hardwell and Rehab – "Blue Magic" (Chuckie & Silvio Ecomo Remix)
 Chris Kaeser – "Who's in the House" (DJ Chuckie Remix)
 Sunnery James and Ryan Marciano – "Pondo" (Chuckie & Silvio Ecomo Mix)

2010
 Bob Sinclar featuring Sean Paul – "Tik Tok" (Chuckie & R3hab Remix)
 3OH!3 featuring Kesha – "First Kiss" (Chuckie Remix Extended)
 Black Eyed Peas – "Rock That Body" (Chuckie Remix)
 Kelly Rowland featuring David Guetta – "Commander" (Chuckie & Albert Neve Remix)
 Enrique Iglesias featuring Ludacris and DJ Frank E – "Tonight (I'm Lovin' You)" (Chuckie Remix)
 Enrique Iglesias featuring Pitbull – "I Like It" (Chuckie Remix)
 Robbie Rivera featuring Fast Eddie – "Let Me Sip My Drink" (Chuckie Remix)
 Sidney Samson featuring Lady Bee – "Shut Up & Let It Go" (Chuckie Remix)
 Luis Lopez vs. Jesse Lee – "Is This Love" (Chuckie Remix)
 Erick Morillo and Eddie Thoneick featuring Shawnee Taylor – "Live Your Life" (Chuckie Remix)
 Toni Braxton – "So Yesterday" (Chuckie Remix)
 Sergio Mauri featuring Janet Gray – "Everybody Dance" (Chuckie Remix)
 Nari & Milani and Cristian Marchi featuring Luciana – "I Got My Eye on You" (Chuckie Remix)
 Pendulum – "Witchcraft" (Chuckie Remix)
 Mohombi – "Bumpy Ride" (Chuckie Remix)
 Moby – "Jltf" (Chuckie Remix)
 Lil Jon featuring Claude Kelly – "Oh What a Night" (Chuckie Remix)
 Felix Da Housecat – "Silver Screen Shower Scene" (Chuckie & Silvio Ecomo Acid Mix)
 Picco – "Venga" (Chuckie's Back to Voltage Remix)
 Diddy - Dirty Money – "Hello, Good Morning" (Chuckie's Bad Boy Went Dirty Dutch Remix)
 Lock 'N Load – "Blow Ya Mind 2011" (Chuckie Meets Obek & Neve Mix)
 Nervo featuring Ollie James – "Irresistible" (Chuckie & Gregori Klosman Remix)

2011
 Michael Jackson – "Hollywood Tonight" (Chuckie Remix)
 Ely Supastar and Henry L featuring Dawn Tallman – "Money for Love" (Chuckie Remix)
 DJ Smash – "From Russia with Love" (Chuckie & Gregori Klosman Remix)
 Carolina Márquez – "Wicked Wow" (DJ Chuckie Extended Mix)
 Nause – "Made Of" (Chuckie Remix)
 Mastiksoul and Dada featuring Akon and Paul G - "Bang It All" (Chuckie Remix)
 Diddy - Dirty Money - "I Hate That You Love Me" (Chuckie Marquee Remix)
 Jean-Roch featuring Flo Rida and Kat Deluna – "I'm Alright" (Chuckie Remix)
 Erick Morillo and Eddie Thoneick featuring Shawnee Taylor – "Stronger" (Chuckie & Gregori Klosman Remix)
 Eva – "Ashes" (Chuckie Remix)
 Wynter Gordon – "Buy My Love" (Chuckie Remix)
 The Saturdays – "Notorious" (Chuckie Extended Mix)
 DJ Obek featuring Ambush – "Craissy" (Chuckie & Albert Neve 4Ibiza Remix)
 Laurent Wery featuring Swift K.I.D. and Dev – "Hey Hey Hey (Pop Another Bottle)" (Chuckie Club Mix)
 Rihanna featuring Calvin Harris – "We Found Love" (Chuckie Extended Mix)
 Kelly Rowland – "Down for Whatever" (Chuckie Remix)
 Neon Hitch – "Bad Dog" (Chuckie Remix)
 Wildboys – "Dominoes" (Chuckie Extended Mix)

2012
 Neon Hitch - "F U Betta" (Chuckie Club Remix)
 Sarvi - "Amore" (Chuckie Remix)
 Donaeo - "Party Hard" (Genairo Nvilla & Chuckie Amazone Project Remix)
 Skepta - "Punch His Face" (Genairo Nvilla & Chuckie King Of Drums Rework)
 Aba and Simonsen - "Soul Bossa Nova" (Chuckie & Mastiksoul Remix)
 KeeMo featuring Cosmo Klein - "Beautiful Lie" (Chuckie, Ortzy & Nico Hamuy Remix)
 Dada Life - "Rolling Stones T-Shirt" (Chuckie Remix)
 Milk & Sugar featuring Neri Per Caso - "Via Con Me (It's Wonderful)" (Chuckie Remix)
 Wallpaper - "Fucking Best Song Ever" (Chuckie & Glowinthedark Remix)
 Baauer - "Harlem Shake" (Chuckie Remix)
 Sub Focus featuring Alpines - "Tidal Wave" (Chuckie Remix)
 Roscoe Dash - "Good Good Night" (Chuckie & Horny Sanchez Smash Krank Remix)

2013
 Pitbull featuring TJR - "Don't Stop the Party" (Chuckie's Funky Vodka Mix)

2014
 Timeflies – "All the Way" (Chuckie Remix)
 Shakira - "Dare (La La La)" (Chuckie Remix)
 T-ara - "Sugar Free" (Chuckie Remix)
 Deadmau5 - "Ghosts 'n' Stuff" (Chuckie Remix)

2015
 Cash Cash ft. Busta Rhymez, B.O.B and Neon Hitch - "Devil" (Chuckie & Diamond Pistols Remix)
 Childsplay ft. Jayh - "Bobbel" (Chuckie & Childsplay Remix)

Guest appearances

 2010: "Work It Out" (Lil Jon featuring Pitbull and Chuckie)
 2011: "It's Not You (It's Me)" (T-Pain vs. Chuckie featuring Pitbull)

References

External links
 
 BBC Radio 1's Residency

1978 births
Living people
Club DJs
Dutch DJs
Surinamese DJs
People from Paramaribo
Remixers
Dutch electronic musicians
Surinamese emigrants to the Netherlands
BBC Radio 1 presenters
Spinnin' Records artists
Progressive house musicians
Electronic dance music DJs